The 2014 PFF Peace Cup was the third edition of the tournament, an international football competition organized by the Philippine Football Federation (PFF) to celebrate peace month in the country through football. It was held at the Rizal Memorial Stadium in Manila and was originally scheduled to take place from September 3–9, 2014.  It was then revised to September 3–6 due to a change in format.

Participants
PFF president Mariano Araneta stated that the teams being initially eyed are Chinese Taipei, Myanmar, Palestine and Vietnam.  The PFF were due to announce the final list of invited teams on August 6, a day after the 2014 AFF Suzuki Cup draw in Hanoi, Vietnam.  At the draw, where Philippines coach Thomas Dooley was in attendance, he revealed that Palestine, Myanmar and Vietnam were the invitees for the tournament.  However, Vietnam would only take part if they were not drawn with the Philippines at the Suzuki Cup.  Vietnam were however drawn with the Philippines therefore another team would need to be invited. On August 7, the PFF confirmed the participation of Myanmar, Palestine as well as Chinese Taipei which replaced Vietnam.

Venue

Matches
The tournament was originally to be a single round-robin tournament format with match dates on September 3, 6 and 9.  However, the PFF received an advisory from FIFA on August 28 informing them of the new "two-match per international window" regulations.  Therefore, the PFF revised the format to allot a maximum of two matches.

Semifinals

Third place match

Final

Statistics

Awards

Goalscorers
5 goals
 Ahmad Maher Wridat

2 goals
 Yen Ho-shen
 Kyaw Zayar Win
 Mark Hartmann

1 goal

 Lin Chang-lun
 Wu Pai-ho
 Kyaw Ko Ko
 Min Min Thu
 Nanda Lin Kyaw Chit
 Soe Min Oo
 Tin Win Aung
 Abdelhamid Abuhabib
 Abdelatif Bahdari
 Javier Mereles
 Rob Gier
 Daisuke Sato
 James Younghusband
 Phil Younghusband

1 own goal
 Chen Yi-wei (playing against the Philippines)

References

2014
2014 in Philippine football